Cristián Antonio Flores Vásquez (born 5 March 1972) is a Chilean former professional footballer who played as a defender.

He played for Chilean and Mexican clubs while representing the Chile national team at international level.

Personal life
Flores is better known by his nickname Pistola (Gun) what was given when he was a child due to the fact that he wanted a toy gun for Christmas and his mother gave him a carved wooden gun.

He is the father of the professional footballer .

He started a football academy in Valparaíso called Pistola Flores like him what generated controversies due to the fact that the logo have a gun.

In 2017, he took part of the season 3 of the TV program Masterchef Chile.

Honours
Santiago Wanderers
 Segunda División: 1995

References

External links
 
 Cristián Flores at MemoriaWanderers 

1972 births
Living people
Sportspeople from Valparaíso
Association football defenders
Chilean footballers
Chilean expatriate footballers
Chile international footballers
Santiago Wanderers footballers
Everton de Viña del Mar footballers
Santiago Morning footballers
Colo-Colo footballers
Atlante F.C. footballers
Irapuato F.C. footballers
Chilean Primera División players
Primera B de Chile players
Liga MX players
Chilean expatriate sportspeople in Mexico
Expatriate footballers in Mexico
Chilean football managers